Claudia Rauschenbach (born 14 October 1984 in Karl-Marx-Stadt) is a German former competitive pair skater. With partner Robin Szolkowy, she is the 2001 German national champion and 1999 & 2000 junior national champion.

She is the daughter of Anett Pötzsch and Axel Witt and the stepdaughter of Axel Rauschenbach.  She is the niece of two-time Olympic champion Katarina Witt.

Competitive highlights
(with Szolkowy)

References

 

German female pair skaters
Sportspeople from Chemnitz
1984 births
Living people